The U.S. Green Building Council (USGBC), co-founded by Mike Italiano, David Gottfried and Rick Fedrizzi in 1993, is a private 501(c)3, membership-based non-profit organization that promotes sustainability in building design, construction, and operation. USGBC is best known for its development of the Leadership in Energy and Environmental Design (LEED) green building rating systems and its annual Greenbuild International Conference and Expo, the world's largest conference and expo dedicated to green building. USGBC was one of eight national councils that helped found the World Green Building Council (WorldGBC). The current president and CEO is Peter Templeton.

Through its partnership with the Green Business Certification Inc. (GBCI), USGBC offers a suite of LEED professional credentials that denote expertise in the field of green building. USGBC incentivizes LEED certification by awarding extra certification points to building projects completed with a LEED-certified professional on staff.

Leadership in Energy and Environmental Design (LEED)

The LEED Green Building Rating System (LEED) is a program that provides third-party verification of green buildings. The LEED rating systems address both a wide variety of buildings types, including commercial buildings, homes, neighborhoods, retail, healthcare, and schools, as well as every phase of the building lifecycle including design, construction, operations and maintenance. Projects may earn one of four levels of LEED certification (Certified, Silver, Gold or Platinum) by achieving a given number of point-based credits within the rating system.

Development of LEED began in 1993, spearheaded by Natural Resources Defense Council (NRDC) senior scientist Robert K. Watson. JD Polk, co-founder of Solar Cells Inc (First Solar), also contributed to the guidelines set forth in the initial formation, as did long time solar advocate Lawton Chiles the Governor of Florida at the time. As founding chairman of the LEED Steering Committee,  Watson led a broad-based consensus process until 2007, bringing together non-profit organizations, government agencies, architects, engineers, developers, builders, product manufacturers and other industry leaders. The LEED initiative was supported by a strong USGBC Board of Directors, chaired by Steven Winter from 1999 to 2003, and very active staff, including Nigel Howard. At that time, USGBC’s Senior Vice President of LEED, Scot Horst, became chair of the LEED Steering Committee before joining USGBC staff. Early LEED committee members also included USGBC co-founder Mike Italiano, architects Bill Reed and Sandy Mendler, builder Gerard Heiber and Myron Kibbe and engineer Richard Bourne. As interest in LEED grew, in 1996, engineers Tom Paladino and Lynn Barker co-chaired the newly formed LEED technical committee.

Beginning with its launch in 2000, LEED has grown from one rating system for new construction to a comprehensive system of nine interrelated rating systems covering all aspects of the development and construction process. Since its inception, LEED has grown from six volunteers on one committee to more than 200 volunteers on nearly 20 committees and nearly 200 professional staff.

USGBC was awarded the American Architectural Foundation’s Keystone Award in 2012. The National Building Museum presented the USGBC with its 2009 Honor Award (themed "Visionaries in Sustainability"), citing the organization's "exceptional achievement in establishing and integrating green building standards" in its LEED systems as one of the reasons for selection. The museum also awarded USGBC with its Henry C. Turner Prize in 2005 for its leadership and innovation in the construction industry, specifically for LEED. To date, it is the only organization to have received two awards from the Building Museum.

Legislation

On May 23, 2013, U.S. Rep. David McKinley introduced the Better Buildings Act of 2014 (H.R. 2126; 113th Congress) into the United States House of Representatives. The bill would amend federal law aimed at improving the energy efficiency of commercial office buildings. The bill would also create a program called "Tenant Star" similar to the existing Energy Star program. The U.S. Green Building Council was involved in organizing and supporting this bill.

The U.S. Green Building Council also supported the Streamlining Energy Efficiency for Schools Act of 2014 (H.R. 4092; 113th Congress), a bill that would require the United States Department of Energy to establish a centralized clearinghouse to disseminate information on federal programs, incentives, and mechanisms for financing energy-efficient retrofits and upgrades at schools. The U.S. Green Building Council said that the bill "aims to make important improvements to existing federal policies."

See also

 Green building council
 UK Green Building Council
 Philippine Green Building Council* Green Business Certification Inc.
 Green building in the United States
 Green Building on College Campuses
 LEED Accredited Professional Exam
 Sustainable architecture

References

External links

USGBC official website

Energy in the United States
Green Building Councils
Environmental organizations based in Washington, D.C.
Sustainable building in the United States
Organizations based in Washington, D.C.
1993 establishments in the United States